Alan Sosa (born 18 March 1994) is an Argentine professional footballer who plays as a midfielder, most recently for Brown.

Career

Club
Sosa's career began with Brown. His professional debut arrived on 5 April 2013 during a 4–0 win in Primera B Metropolitana over Villa Dálmine, which was his sole appearance in the 2012–13 season which Brown ended with promotion. In the following four years, Sosa featured in a total of eleven matches for the club. In July 2017, Sosa joined Primera C Metropolitana's Cañuelas on loan. Two goals, including his career first against Dock Sud on 6 March, in twenty appearances followed.

International
In 2016, Sosa was selected by Julio Olarticoechea's Argentina U23s for the Sait Nagjee Trophy in India.

Career statistics
.

Honours
Brown
Primera B Metropolitana: 2015

References

External links

1994 births
Living people
People from Ezeiza, Buenos Aires
Argentine footballers
Association football midfielders
Atlético Morelia players
Primera B Metropolitana players
Primera Nacional players
Primera C Metropolitana players
Club Atlético Brown footballers
Cañuelas footballers
Sportspeople from Buenos Aires Province